Jessica Eldridge (born December 17, 1997) is a Canadian ice hockey player, who skated for the Canadian National women's ice hockey team during its Rivalry Series with the United States national team in February 2020. A graduate of Colgate University, Eldridge skated with Team Bauer, representing the Montreal area, in the 2020–21 PWHPA season.

Playing career

NCAA
Graduating from the Colgate Raiders in 2019, Eldridge recorded 74 goals and 89 assists, earning the top spot on Colgate's all-time points leader board. Eldridge appeared in the 2018 NCAA National Collegiate Women's Ice Hockey Tournament Championship game, an historic first in program history. In the 2018–19 Colgate Raiders women's ice hockey season, her 30-goal output broke the program record for most goals in a single season.

Hockey Canada
Eldridge attended Canada's National Women's Development Team selection camp in Calgary, Alberta in August 2019. Named to Canada's roster for the February 2020 Rivalry Series versus the United States, Eldridge made her debut with the national team on February 3, 2020 in Victoria, British Columbia.

In April 2021, Eldridge was part of the National Women's Team Selection Camp Roster, in anticipation of the 2021 IIHF Women's World Championships.

PWHPA
Skating for Team Bauer (Montreal), Eldridge participated in the 2021 Secret Cup, which was the Canadian leg of the PWHPA Dream Gap Tour. In a 4-2 championship game win over Team Sonnet (Toronto), she logged a goal and an assist.

Awards and honors

PWHL
Toronto Aeros captain (2014–15)
PWHL scoring champion (2014–15)

NCAA
 ECAC Third-Team All-Star (2016–17)
 ECAC Player of the Month December 2018
 ECAC Player of the Month February 2019

References

1997 births
Canadian women's ice hockey forwards
Ice hockey people from Simcoe County
Living people
Colgate Raiders women's ice hockey players
Professional Women's Hockey Players Association players
Sportspeople from Barrie